In United States tax law, certain performing artists are eligible to deduct the expenses incurred in the course of their employment by § 62(a)(2)(B) of the Internal Revenue Code. This is an "above the line" deduction, meaning that it is used while computing a taxpayer's adjusted gross income. It is an exception to the general rule, which requires job-related expenses to be a miscellaneous itemized deduction subject to the "2% haircut" rule of itemized deductions. As such, it is a favorable tax situation for the performing artist taxpayer.

To qualify for this deduction, a taxpayer must fit certain criteria:
 The taxpayer must have worked as a performing artist for at least two employers,
 the amount of the deduction must exceed ten percent of the taxpayer's gross income that is attributed to those performances, and
 the adjusted gross income of the taxpayer, not counting this exception, does not exceed $16,000. See I.R.C. § 62(b)(1).

In determining who his or her "employers" were for purposes of this statute, the taxpayer must only consider those employers that paid the taxpayer an amount equal to or greater than $200 for the taxpayer's performance. See I.R.C. § 62(b)(2). As a result of this, relatively unknown artists who are paid less than $200 per performance are not allowed to take this exception. Artists who are sometimes paid an amount equal to or greater than $200 and other times paid less than that amount can only claim the instances on which he or she received over $200.

On the opposite end of the spectrum, artists who have an AGI more than $16,000 in a taxable year before this deduction are not allowed to take this deduction. This excludes well-known performing artists who make a large amount of income from playing shows from deducting their income therefrom.

This $16,000 cap has not been raised since 1986, meaning very few artists actually take advantage of the deduction due to inflation. The deduction was intended for performers who pay their own airfare to and from engagements and who have the difficulty of spreading deductions over schedule C and schedule A.

Additionally, any taxpayer who attempts to claim this deduction must either be single or married filing jointly. See I.R.C. § 62(b)(3).

See also 
I.R.C. § 162(a) for further information on deduction of business expenses.
 Article about the cap on the Qualified Performing Artist deduction

Taxation in the United States